Oak Springs is a census-designated place (CDP) in Apache County, Arizona, United States. The population was 63 at the 2010 census.

Geography

Demographics

Education
Oak Springs is within the Window Rock Unified School District. Window Rock High School is the local high school.

Two nearby Bureau of Indian Education (BIE)-operated schools take students from Oak Springs: Cove Day School and Red Rock Day School.

References

Census-designated places in Apache County, Arizona
Populated places on the Navajo Nation